These are the official results of the Men's 400 metres Hurdles event at the 1991 IAAF World Championships in Tokyo, Japan. There were a total number of 36 participating athletes, with five qualifying heats, two semi-finals and the final held on Tuesday August 27, 1991.

Schedule
All times are Japan Standard Time (UTC+9)

Final

Semi-finals
Held on Monday 1991-08-26

Qualifying heats
Held on Sunday 1991-08-25

See also
 1988 Men's Olympic 400m Hurdles (Seoul)
 1990 Men's European Championships 400m Hurdles (Split)
 1992 Men's Olympic 400m Hurdles (Barcelona)

References
 Results

H
400 metres hurdles at the World Athletics Championships